David McLain Carr is Professor of Old Testament at the Union Theological Seminary in New York City. He is a leading scholar of the textual formation of the Hebrew Bible.

Carr received his B.A. from Carleton College in 1980, his M.T.S., from the Candler School of Theology at Emory University in 1983, and his Ph.D. from Claremont Graduate School in 1988.

Joshua Berman describes Carr's The Formation of the Hebrew Bible: A New Reconstruction as a "convention-smashing" book in its use of epigraphic evidence to demonstrate that "many of the forms of editing routinely hypothesized by source critics of the Torah were not employed anywhere else in the ancient Near East." Formation is considered a significant contribution to the empirical side of biblical source criticism.

In Holy Resilience: The Bible’s Traumatic Origins Carr, a Quaker and a committed pacifist, argues that the Old Testament was composed by the Jews in exile in Babylon and reflects their suffering as an exiled and oppressed minority group.  Carr's argument has been criticized for ignoring the consensus among Biblical linguists that the Hebrew Bible was written in pre-exilic Hebrew that would have been impossible for scribes in the period of the Babylonian exile to replicate.

Works

Thesis

Books
 - thoroughly revised version of Ph.D. Thesis

Papers

"Narrative and the real world: An argument for continuity", History and Theory (1986), pp. 117-131
"Torah on the Heart: Literary Jewish Textuality Within Its Ancient Near Eastern Context" Oral Tradition (2010), pp.

Chapters

References 

Living people
Old Testament scholars
Union Theological Seminary (New York City) faculty
Place of birth missing (living people)
Year of birth missing (living people)
Emory University alumni
Carleton College alumni
Candler School of Theology alumni
Claremont Graduate University alumni